Pisolithus is a genus of fungi within the family Sclerodermataceae (suborder Sclerodermatineae). The type species, P. arenarius, is now known to be synonymous with P. arhizus.

Species
As accepted by Species Fungorum;
Pisolithus abditus  – Thailand 
Pisolithus albus 
Pisolithus arenarius 
Pisolithus arhizus 
Pisolithus aurantioscabrosus  - Malaysia 
Pisolithus aureosericeus 
Pisolithus calongei 
Pisolithus capsulifer 
Pisolithus croceorrhizus 
Pisolithus hypogaeus  – Australia
Pisolithus indicus  – India
Pisolithus kisslingii 
Pisolithus marmoratus 
Pisolithus microcarpus 
Pisolithus orientalis 
Pisolithus thermaeus 
Pisolithus tinctorius 
Pisolithus tympanobaculus 

Former species (all Sclerodermataceae family);
 P. arenarius var. novozeelandicus  = Pisolithus arhizus
 P. australis  = Pisolithus arhizus
 P. crassipes  = Pisolithus arhizus
 P. tinctorius  = Pisolithus arhizus
 P. tinctorius' f. clavatus  = Pisolithus arhizus P. tinctorius f. conglomeratus  = Pisolithus arhizus P. tinctorius f. olivaceus  = Pisolithus arhizus P. tinctorius f. pisocarpium  = Pisolithus arhizus P. tinctorius f. tuberosus  = Pisolithus arhizus P. tinctorius f. turgidus  = Pisolithus arhizus P. tuberosus  = Pisolithus arhizus P. turgidus  = Pisolithus arhizus''

References

Boletales
Boletales genera
Taxa named by Lewis David de Schweinitz
Taxa described in 1805
Taxa named by Johannes Baptista von Albertini